Chédigny is a commune in the Indre-et-Loire department in central France.

Geography
The village lies on the right bank of the Indrois, which flows northwest through the southern part of the commune.

Population

See also
Communes of the Indre-et-Loire department

References

Communes of Indre-et-Loire